Ole Enger (1948 – 26 April 2014) was a Norwegian actor and businessperson.

As a teenager he played the popular role of Stompa in the films Stompa til sjøs, Stompa forelsker seg and Stompa selvfølgelig. He took an accountant education, became chief financial officer in Erling Sande Gruppen and Bergheim before being managing director of Stor-Oslo Service and Persontransport Norge. He died in April 2014 after a long battle with cancer.

Filmography

References

1948 births
2014 deaths
Male actors from Oslo
Norwegian male film actors
Businesspeople from Oslo
Deaths from cancer in Norway
Chief financial officers